Wang Dandan (born May 1, 1985 in Beijing) is a Chinese football player who competed for the national team in the 2008 Summer Olympics. Her position is midfielder.

International goals

Major performances
2005 National Games - 1st
2006 Asian Youth Championship - 2nd
2006/2008 Asian Cup - 1st/2nd

References
http://2008teamchina.olympic.cn/index.php/personview/personsen/877
https://web.archive.org/web/20080810200834/http://results.beijing2008.cn/WRM/ENG/BIO/Athlete/0/236610.shtml

1985 births
Living people
Chinese women's footballers
Footballers at the 2008 Summer Olympics
Olympic footballers of China
Footballers from Beijing
Asian Games medalists in football
Footballers at the 2006 Asian Games
China women's international footballers
Asian Games bronze medalists for China
Women's association football midfielders
Medalists at the 2006 Asian Games